Paul Colichman (born 1962) is an American media entrepreneur who founded the gay cable channel Here!. In 2008, John Waters nicknamed Colichman "the gay Citizen Hearst." He is the CEO of Here Media, Inc. and has produced and/or distributed over 200 motion pictures and television series episodes, most notably Academy-award winning film Gods and Monsters, starring Ian McKellen, Brendan Fraser and Lynn Redgrave.

Business ventures
Colichman serves as Chief Executive Officer of Here Media, Inc. Colichman is best known for producing the Academy Award winning film Gods and Monsters. With his longtime business partner Stephen P. Jarchow, Colichman has produced and/or distributed over 200 motion pictures and television series episodes.
Colichman received a B.A and M.B.A. from the University of California, Los Angeles, where he served as University film commissioner and on the Board of Directors of ASUCLA
As an undergraduate, Colichman was the associate producer for one of the first-ever benefit concerts for AIDS, which featured Debbie Reynolds at the Hollywood Bowl in Los Angeles, California. Colichman landed his first job producing a charity event for Miles Copeland, which benefitted the AMC Cancer Research Center.

After graduating, Colichman worked at Fox, where at the age of 24 he was head of late night programming and created the Joan Rivers Show, before partnering with Miles Copeland III in the film company I.R.S. Media.

In 1995, Peter Dekom introduced Colichman to Stephen P. Jarchow, a tax and real estate lawyer. Their shared business vision led them to form Regent Entertainment.

In 2008, Colichman and Jarchow acquired The Advocate and OUT Magazine.

In 2009, Here Networks LLC along with its publishing subsidiaries, and PlanetOut were combined to form Here Media, Inc. and Colichman was appointed CEO.

Awards
Gods and Monsters received three Academy Award nominations (winning for Best Adapted Screenplay), four Golden Globe nominations (winning for Best Supporting Actress), three Independent Spirit Awards, and the National Board of Review's Best Picture honor. Twilight of the Golds, produced by Colichman, won two Cable Ace Awards. Colichman also executive produced the Academy Award nominated film Tom and Viv, which starred Willem Dafoe, Miranda Richardson, and Rosemary Harris. Mr. Colichman's Regent Releasing distributed the motion picture Departures, which received the 2008 Best Foreign Language Film Academy Award.

 Academy Award Winner, Best Adapted Screenplay (1999) – Producer, Gods and Monsters
 Academy Award Winner, Best Foreign Language Film (2008) – Producer, Departures
 UCLA Anderson's 100 most Inspirational Alumni 
 GLAAD Media Awards – under Colichman's ownership, Here Media Inc. titles have won 5 GLAAD Media Awards (The Advocate (3), Out (2))
 Power Up Premiere Award (2004) – Here TV
 Broadcast Film Critics Association Award (2009) – Departures
 Rainbow Key Award (2009) – Lesbian and Gay Advisory Board, City of West Hollywood
 Barbara Gittings Award (GLAAD Media Award, 2006)
 Stonewall Democratic Club, Sheldon Anderson Award (2009)
 Telly Award (2006): Here Networks – "Love and Sex: West Hollywood, CA"
 Independent Spirit Award (1999): Gods and Monsters – Producer
 Independent Spirit Award (1999): Gods and Monsters – Best Feature
 Ribbon of Hope Award (2007): Here Focus on HIV/AIDS
 GLAAD Media Award (2009): Outstanding Film, Limited Release: Shelter

Nominations
 Daytime Emmy Awards (2012) – Executive Producer – Outstanding Special Class Special: "30 Years from Here"
 Daytime Emmy Awards (2009) – Executive Producer – Outstanding Special Class Special: "11th Annual Ribbon of Hope Celebration"
 CableACE Awards (1993) – Music Special: Sting at the Hollywood Bowl (1991)
 PGA Awards (1999) – Outstanding Producer of Theatrical Motion Pictures: Gods and Monsters
 Golden Satellite Awards (1999) – Best Motion Picture – Drama: Gods and Monsters

Select filmography

See also
PlanetOut Inc.

References

1962 births
Living people
American LGBT businesspeople
University of California, Los Angeles alumni
UCLA Anderson School of Management alumni
American chief executives in the media industry
American television producers
American film producers
LGBT television producers
LGBT film producers